Ioan Șișeștean (June 11, 1936 – April 12, 2011) was the bishop of the Greek Catholic Diocese of Maramureș, Romania.

He was born in Șișești, Maramureș County. Ordained in 1972 by Ioan Dragomir, Șișeștean was consecrated bishop by Lucian Mureșan on September 11, 1994. He died in Baia Sprie, while still in office.

Notes

1936 births
2011 deaths
Romanian Greek-Catholic bishops
People from Maramureș County